J. William Harbour, M.D., is an American ophthalmologist, ocular oncologist and cancer researcher.  He is currently Chair of the Department of Ophthalmology at the University of Texas Southwestern Medical Center in Dallas. He previously served as the vice chair and director of ocular oncology at the Bascom Palmer Eye Institute and associate director for basic science at the Sylvester Comprehensive Cancer Center of the University of Miami's Miller School of Medicine.

Harbour's clinical practice focuses on intraocular tumors, including uveal (ocular) melanoma, retinoblastoma, lymphoma and other neoplasms.  His field of research includes the genetics and genomics of cancer, with a focus on prognostic biomarkers, mechanisms of metastasis, and molecular targeted therapies.  He has given over 300 invited scientific lectures, and published over 200 peer-reviewed scientific articles and book chapters. Dr. Harbour founded the Ocular Oncology Service at the Washington University School of Medicine in St. Louis, where he was the Paul A. Cibis Distinguished Professor of Ophthalmology & Visual Sciences.

Early life and education 

J. William Harbour, M.D., is a native of Dallas, Texas. He graduated from Hillcrest High School and earned his undergraduate degree in biochemistry at Texas A&M University, where he graduated summa cum laude. Harbour then attended medical school at Johns Hopkins, where he developed a keen interest in cancer biology. He completed medical school in 1990, followed by ophthalmology residency at the Wills Eye Hospital in Philadelphia, clinical fellowship in vitreoretinal diseases and surgery at the Bascom Palmer Eye Institute, and ocular oncology fellowship at the University of California, San Francisco.

Medical career 

After his medical training, Harbour accepted a position as assistant professor at Washington University in St. Louis, where he remained for 16 years and rose through the ranks to the title of Paul A. Cibis Distinguished Professor of Ophthalmology, professor of medicine and professor of cell biology and physiology.  In 2012, he was recruited to the Bascom Palmer Eye Institute and Sylvester Comprehensive Cancer Center of the University of Miami as professor of ophthalmology, biochemistry and molecular biology.  He served as vice chair for translational research, medical director of the echography and clinical research units, and director of ocular oncology at Bascom Palmer, and associate director for basic research at Sylvester.  He established the Bascom Palmer ocular oncology fellowship program and served as the fellowship director.

Research 

Harbour developed a keen interest in research during his undergraduate years at Texas A&M, where he studied the function of the copper protein ceruloplasmin in the laboratory of Dr. Edward Harris.  During  medical school at Johns Hopkins, he was accepted to the Howard Hughes Medical Institute–National Institutes of Health (HHMI–NIH) Research Scholars Program in Bethesda, MD, where he carried out research in the National Cancer Institute laboratory of Dr. John Minna.  This research resulted in a breakthrough discovery published in the journal Science in 1988, with Harbour as first author.  Previously it had been thought that mutations in the retinoblastoma gene, the first tumor suppressor gene to be discovered, would be limited to the rare eye cancer retinoblastoma.  However, Harbour and co-authors showed that the gene was commonly mutated in a common form of lung cancer. This discovery added to increasing recognition of the retinoblastoma tumor suppressor pathway as a common target of mutation in the vast majority of human cancers.

When Harbour joined Washington University in 1996, he undertook a three-year postdoctoral research training program in molecular oncology, which resulted in a first author publication in the journal Cell showing that the retinoblastoma protein is regulated by successive phosphorylation events.  This discovery was subsequently corroborated by protein crystallography and other lines of investigation and have helped to explain how some cancer cells inactivate the retinoblastoma protein by phosphorylation rather than mutation.

In the early 2000s, the focus of Harbour's research turned to uveal melanoma, in which he discovered a gene expression profile that predicted with great accuracy which of these cancers would remain localized to the eye (class 1 profile) and which would metastasize (class 2 profile).  Based on this discovery, his group developed a highly accurate clinical prognostic test with high technical performance and prognostic accuracy.  The prognostic accuracy of the test was validated in the largest multicenter prospective validation study of its kind ever conducted in the field of ocular oncology.  This study also demonstrated the prognostic superiority of the gene expression profile test over traditional clinical features used in the TNM classification, as well as chromosome 3 status, neither of which provided prognostic information that was independent of the gene expression profile test.

Subsequently, the test has been showcased in a front-page story in The New York Times, in a segment on CBS News Sunday Morning, and other media outlets, and it has been licensed to Castle Biosciences, Inc. which provides the test for clinical use under the trade name DecisionDx-UM.

In 2010, Harbour was first author on a landmark paper in the journal Science describing frequent mutations in the tumor suppressor gene BAP1 in uveal melanoma. These mutations were strongly associated with metastasis, thereby opening a new avenue of research into the cause of metastasis in this cancer.

In 2012, the Harbour lab discovered that the histone deacetylase inhibitors may be repurposed to also treat uveal melanoma by reversing the high risk class 2 profile. Subsequently, this discovery has formed the basis for an innovative clinical trial at Bascom Palmer Eye Institute and Sylvester Comprehensive Cancer Center to assess the use of the histone deacetylase inhibitor Vorinostat in patients with high risk uveal melanoma.

In 2013, Harbour was first author on another landmark paper in the journal Nature Genetics describing frequent mutations in the splicing factor SF3B1 in uveal melanoma.  Unlike BAP1, mutations in SF3B1 were associated with better clinical outcome.

In 2016, the Harbour lab discovered that the cancer-testis antigen PRAME is yet another prognostic biomarker in uveal melanoma. Both class 1 and class 2 uveal melanomas expressing PRAME were shown to have a worse prognosis, but these tumors may also be subject to immunotherapy directed against PRAME.

In 2018, the Harbour lab reported the largest number of uveal melanomas analyzed to date with next generation sequencing.  In this report in Nature Communications, they created a customized bioinformatic pipeline that detected twice as many BAP1 mutations than previous methods, they discovered new driver mutations in the splicing factors SF3A1, SRSF2, SRSF7 and RBM10, and they used new clonality algorithms to reveal that all of the canonical genomic aberrations in uveal melanoma occur relatively early in tumor evolution.

In 2020, the Harbour lab was the first to publish single-cell sequencing data in uveal melanoma, showing previously unrecognized evolutionary and microenvironmental complexity in primary and metastatic tumors. They also discovered LAG3 as the predominant checkpoint molecule in this cancer, opening up new possibilities for immunotherapy in patients with uveal melanoma.

Harbour was awarded a $2.5 million grant from the NCI (National Cancer Institute) entitled "Molecular Predictive Testing in Uveal Melanoma," which will involve approximately 30 centers in the U.S. and Canada, with about half of the patients diagnosed annually with ocular melanoma in the U.S. expected to be enrolled.

Discoveries 

 Discovered that mutations in the retinoblastoma gene are common in small cell lung cancer.
 Discovered the mechanism by which successive phosphorylation events inactivate the retinoblastoma protein.
 Discovered a gene expression profile that predicts metastasis in uveal melanoma. This discovery led to the development of a widely used clinical prognostic test.
 Discovered driver mutations in the tumor suppressor gene BAP1 in uveal melanoma, which are associated with metastasis and poor prognosis.
 Discovered driver mutations in the splicing factor SF3B1 and other splicing factors (SF3A1, SRSF2, SRSF7 and RBM10) in uveal melanoma, which are associated with intermediate prognosis.
 Discovered the first germline BAP1 mutation and the BAP1 familial cancer syndrome.
 Discovered that histone deacetylase inhibitors reverse the biochemical effects of BAP1 mutation and may play a role in targeted systemic therapy for uveal melanoma.
 Discovered the biomarker PRAME as a risk factor for metastasis in uveal melanoma.
 Discovered that LAG3 is the predominant T cell checkpoint molecule in uveal melanoma as a potential target of immunotherapy.

Clinical accomplishments 

Dr. Harbour is fellowship trained in surgical retina and ocular oncology, and he has treated thousands of patients with uveal melanoma, retinoblastoma, ocular metastatic disease, ocular hemangiomas, ocular hamartomas and many other ocular tumors. He has trained over 50 clinical fellows, and receives patients from around the world.  He has pioneered new surgical methods regarding fine needle biopsy, laser treatment, and brachytherapy of ocular tumors. He was also awarded patents for innovations in genetic prognostic testing in uveal melanoma.

Awards and recognition 

In 2005, Harbour received the prestigious Cogan Award from the Association for Research in Vision and Ophthalmology (ARVO), recognizing the most promising young researcher in vision science worldwide. In 2008, he received the Rosenthal Award from the Macula Society for an "individual under 50 years of age whose work gives high promise of a notable advance in the clinical treatment of disorders of the eye." In 2012, he received the Senior Achievement Award from the American Academy of Ophthalmology. In 2013, he received the Florida Society of Ophthalmology Shaler Richardson, MD Service to Medicine Award for "personal contribution to quality patient care by collaborating and integrating ophthalmology into the medical profession on a national level." In 2014, he received the Paul Henkind Memorial Award from the Macula Society for outstanding retinal research.  In 2015, he received the Retina Research Foundation / Kayser Global Award "for Dr. Harbour's breakthroughs in genetic and genomic research."

See also 

 Ophthalmology
 BAP1
 DecisionDx-UM
 Uveal melanoma
 Retinoblastoma
 SF3B1
 PRAME
 Intraocular lymphoma

References

External links 

 Bascom Palmer Eye Institute, University of Miami
 Sylvester Comprehensive Cancer Center, University of Miami
 Johns Hopkins Medicine – Health
 My Uveal Melanoma, Ask the Doctor: Dr. J. William Harbour
 American Academy of Ophthalmology,  MD Roundtable: Choroidal Nevus or Melanoma? – By Arun D. Singh, MD, with Bertil E. Damato, MD, PhD, and J. William Harbour, MD
 Research Gate, Driver Mutations in Uveal Melanoma: Associations With Gene Expression Profile and Patient Outcomes
 Eurek Alert, New biomarker identifies uveal melanoma patients at high risk for metastasis
 Biomarker expression may predict metastasis in uveal melanoma
 US National Library of Medicine  National Institutes of Health – Genomic, Prognostic, J. William Harbour, MD and Cell-Signaling Advances in Uveal Melanoma,
 The Smart Science Aggregator – Researchers discover new biomarker that puts patients at higher risk for metastasis of uveal melanoma
 Johns Hopkins University – Official site
 Hillcrest High School, Dallas, Official site
 Texas A&M University, College Station, TX – Official site
 Sylvester Researchers Study Size and Gene Expression to Classify Uveal Melanomas | Miller School of Medicine | University of Miami

1963 births
Living people
American ophthalmologists
People from Dallas
Johns Hopkins School of Medicine alumni
Texas A&M University alumni
American oncologists
American medical researchers
21st-century American inventors